Tyrosine-protein kinase TXK is an enzyme that in humans is encoded by the TXK gene.

References

Further reading

Tyrosine kinases